Nuru is a village in Silifke district of Mersin Province, Turkey. (Although the name is Nuru, sometimes is spelled as Nuri). Nuru is a village in forests. The population of the village is 685 as of 2011. According to village page, it is founded about 700 years ago. Main economic activities are agriculture and animal breeding. Main crops are pistachio, figs, plum and hickory nut.

References

Villages in Silifke District